Gioia's Deli, located in The Hill, St. Louis, was named a James Beard America’s Classic in 2017, the first St. Louis restaurant.  Opened in 1918, it was sold to the Donley family in 1980. A Downtown St. Louis location opened in 2016.  They are famous for their hot salami sandwiches. Fazio's Bakery supplies the bread and the cured meats are from Volpi Salumeria. Co-owner Alex Donley made them on Bizarre Foods with Andrew Zimmern.

History
The deli was originally as a grocery by Challie Gioia from Marcallo, Italy.

References

External links
St. Louis' Best Secret Menu Items

Restaurants in St. Louis
Delicatessens in the United States
James Beard Foundation Award winners